Ouanes Amor (born 1936) is a Tunisian painter.

He was born in Tunisia and emigrated to France at the age of 17. In 1960, became a student of Roger Chastel, and in 1970, he became an assistant to Gustave Singier. In 1980, Amor became a professor at the École nationale supérieure des Beaux-Arts in Paris.

Amor's work is represented in the collections of the Musée d'Art Moderne de la Ville de Paris and the New National Museum of Monaco.

References 

1936 births
Living people
Tunisian painters